The Baxter–King House is a historic house at 36 Heritage Road in Quincy, Massachusetts.  The -story wood-frame house was built in the 1860s, and is one of the city's finest Italianate houses.  The L-shaped house dominated by a three-story square tower with a shallow hip roof that has a bracketed and modillioned eave. An elaborately decorated entry projects from the tower.  Windows are varied in shape, including round-arch windows with drip moulding, and single and doubled sash windows.  The house was built by James Baxter Jr., whose daughter Helen married Theophilus King.  King owned a leather business in Boston and was president of the Granite Trust Company.

The house was listed on the National Register of Historic Places in 1989.

References

Houses in Quincy, Massachusetts
Italianate architecture in Massachusetts
Houses completed in 1860
National Register of Historic Places in Quincy, Massachusetts
Houses on the National Register of Historic Places in Norfolk County, Massachusetts
1860 establishments in Massachusetts